Waterberg is one of the 5 districts of Limpopo province of South Africa. The seat of Waterberg is Modimolle. The majority of its 745 758 people speak Sepedi, also known as Northern Sotho (2016 Community Survey). The district code is DC36.

Geography
The municipality contains much of the Waterberg Biosphere, a UNESCO designated Biosphere Reserve. Waterberg is the first region in the northern part of South Africa to be named as a Biosphere Reserve by  UNESCO. The extensive rock formation was shaped by hundreds of millions of years of riverine erosion to yield diverse bluff and butte landform. The ecosystem can be characterised as a dry deciduous forest or Bushveld. Within the Waterberg there are archaeological finds dating to the Stone Age, and nearby are early evolutionary finds related to the origin of humans.

The following sets forth neighboring municipalities and principal municipalities within the Waterberg District Municipality:

Neighbours
Waterberg is surrounded (clockwise) by:
 Vhembe (DC34) to the north-east
 Capricorn (DC35) to the east
 Sekhukhune (CBDC3) to the south-east
 Nkangala (DC31) to the south-east
 Metsweding (CBDC2) to the south
 Bojanala Platinum (DC37) to the south
 Ngaka Modiri Molema (DC38) to the south-west
 the Kgatleng District of the republic of Botswana to the west

Local municipalities
The district contains the following local municipalities:

Source: Statistics South Africa, Community Survey 2016

Demographics
The following statistics are from the 2016 Community Survey

Gender

Ethnic group

Age

Politics

Election results
Election results for Waterberg in the South African Municipal election, 2016

See also
 Municipal Demarcation Board

References

External links 
 Waterberg District Municipality

District municipalities of Limpopo
Waterberg District Municipality